Liski is a town and the administrative center of Liskinsky District in Voronezh Oblast, Russia. Population:

History
Liski was founded as Novaya Pokrovka in 1571 and renamed Svoboda in 1943, and after a period again as Liski.

It was renamed Georgiu-Dezh in 1965 for the Romanian communist leader, Gheorghe Gheorghiu-Dej, before returning to Liski again in 1990.

Administrative and municipal status
Within the framework of administrative divisions, Liski serves as the administrative center of Liskinsky District. As an administrative division, it is, together with the khutor of Kalach in Liskinsky District, is incorporated within Liskinsky District as Liski Urban Settlement. As a municipal division, this administrative unit also has urban settlement status and is a part of Liskinsky Municipal District.

References

Notes

Sources

Cities and towns in Voronezh Oblast
1571 establishments in Russia
Populated places established in 1571